Antoni Ribas i Piera (27 October 1935 – 3 October 2007) was a Catalan Spanish film director and screenwriter. He directed 15 films between 1966 and 2007. His 1973 film La otra imagen was entered into the 1973 Cannes Film Festival.

Filmography
 Gàbies d'or (2007)
 Centenario (2004)
 Tierra de cañones (1999)
 Dalí (1991)
 El primer torero porno (1986)
 Victòria! 3: El seny i la rauxa (1984)
 Victòria! 2: La disbauxa del 17 (1983)
 Victòria! La gran aventura d'un poble (1983)
 Catalans universals (1980)
 Llibertat d'expressió (1977)
 La ciutat cremada (1976)
 La otra imagen (1973)
 Amor y medias (1969)
 Palabras de amor (1968)
 The Wild Ones of San Gil Bridge (1966)

References

External links

1935 births
2007 deaths
Film directors from Catalonia
Male screenwriters
People from Barcelona
Spanish male writers
20th-century Spanish screenwriters
20th-century Spanish male writers